Jonny Weston (born June 16, 1988) is an American actor. He starred as real-life surfer Jay Moriarity in the 2012 film Chasing Mavericks and as brainy high school student David Raskin in the 2015 time-travel adventure Project Almanac. He has also appeared in Sugar, John Dies at the End, About Cherry, Caroline and Jackie, and Kelly & Cal.

Early life
Weston was born in Charleston, South Carolina. His mother is an educational therapist and his father runs a Christian radio station.

Filmography

References

External links
 

21st-century American male actors
American male film actors
American male television actors
Male actors from Charleston, South Carolina
Living people
1988 births